Gian Biagio Conte (born 1941 in La Spezia) is an Italian classicist and professor of Latin Literature at the Scuola Normale Superiore of Pisa.

Life

In particular with the first of these, he first had a fruitful period of collaboration, but then broke contact abruptly in an exchange of letters. Conte also went abroad to study in Munich with Friedrich Klingner and in Paris. At the age of 30, he was made professor of Latin Literature at the University of Siena, later at the University of Pisa and finally, in 2001, at the Scuola Normale Superiore. He enjoys high esteem outside Italy, in particular in the Anglo-Saxon world where he has been invited as guest professor to Oxford, Cambridge, Princeton, Berkeley, and Stanford. In 2007, he ran for the office of director of the Scuola Normale Superiore, but was second to the preceding director Salvatore Settis, who received his third mandate in succession. In 2014 he was elected a Corresponding Fellow of the British Academy.

Work

Conte confines his work basically to Latin literature, mainly to the poetry of the late republic, the Augustan period, and the early empire (Virgil, Lucan, Catullus, the elegiacs, Ovid, Lucretius), but also works on prose writers such as Pliny the Elder and on the novel of Petronius. Conte's approach to Latin literature is characterized by a combination of traditional philology and the innovations of literary theory of the 1970s, in particular structuralism. In his most successful pieces of work, for the most part articles which he later put together to form thematic volumes, Conte breaks with Croce’s historicism and develops the concept of a literary system and of genre based on codes. Conte's approach has been picked up in the last thirty years in particular in the Anglo-Saxon world and successfully elaborated in combination with the theory of intertextuality. Conte has published a Teubner edition of Virgil's Aeneid and continues working, together with a group of researchers and students, on a commentary to go with it, on a commentary on the Satyrica of Petronius and on allegory as a literary and hermeneutical form.

Conte is co-founder and director of the periodical Materiali e discussioni per l'analisi dei testi classici as well as a regular member of the Accademia Nazionale Virgiliana in Mantua.

Amongst his students are Alessandro Schiesaro, Alessandro Barchiesi, Rolando Ferri, Sergio Casali.

Selected writings
Books and collections of articles
 Memoria dei poeti e sistema letterario, Einaudi Torino 1974, 2nd ed. 1985 (engl.  The Rhetoric of Imitation, tr. Glenn W. Most, Cornell U. P. Ithaca/London 1987)
 Virgilio: il genere e i suoi confini, Garzanti Milano 1984
 Letteratura latina: manuale storico dalle origini alla fine dell'impero romano,  Le Monnier Firenze 1987, 2nd ed. 1989, 3rd enl. ed. 1993 (engl. Latin Literature: A History, tr. Joseph B. Solodow, rev. Don Fowler and Glenn W. Most. Baltimore & London: The Johns Hopkins University Press, 1994 (rev. Peter Davis, Scholia Reviews ns 5 (1996) 3)
 Generi e Lettori: saggi su Lucrezio, l'elegia d'amore, l'enciclopedia di Plinio,  Mondadori Milano 1991 (engl. Genres and Readers, tr. Glenn W. Most,  Johns Hopkins U.P., Baltimore)
 L'Autore nascosto: Un'interpretazione del Satyricon di Petronio, Il Mulino Bologna 1997 (engl.  The Hidden Author, California University Press, 1996)
 (with E. Pianezzola und G. Ranucci) Il Dizionario della Lingua Latina, Le Monnier, Firenze 2000
 Virgilio: l'epica del sentimento, Einaudi Torino 2002
 The Poetry of Pathos: Studies in Virgilian Epic. Ed. by S. J. Harrison. Oxford: Oxford University Press 2007, 

Critical editions
 P. Vergilius Maro, Aeneis, ed. Gian Biagio Conte (Bibliotheca scriptorum Graecorum et Romanorum Teubneriana), Berlin, New York: Walter de Gruyter 2009,

References

External links
 Conte at Scuola Normale Superiore di Pisa (including photograph)
 Conte’s bibliography at Scuola Normale Superiore di Pisa

Italian philologists
1941 births
Living people
Italian Latinists
Corresponding Fellows of the British Academy
University of Pisa alumni
Academic staff of the University of Pisa
Scuola Normale Superiore di Pisa alumni
Academic staff of the Scuola Normale Superiore di Pisa